This may refer to:

Aces High Cuby, a small sportsplane
Cuby, Cornwall, a place in Cornwall, England
Saint Cuby, a 6th-century Cornish saint who worked largely in Cornwall and North Wales
Cuby & the Blizzards, a Dutch blues group